Agabetes is a genus of beetles in the family Dytiscidae, containing the following species:

 Agabetes acuductus (Harris, 1828)
 Agabetes svetlanae Nilsson, 1989

References

Dytiscidae genera
Taxa named by George Robert Crotch